Melanie Dargel (born 16 September 2005) is a German rhythmic gymnast. She represents her country in international competitions.

Career 
Dargel debuted at the 2021 European Championships in Varna, 36th in the All-Around, 32nd with hoop, 35th ball, 40th with clubs and 28th with ribbon. In 2022 she competed at the World Cup in Athens, finishing 8th in the All-Around, 8th ball, 10th with clubs and 8th with ribbon winning bronze with hoop. In April she was present at the stage in Sofia being 8th  in the All-Around, 11th with hoop, 8th ball, 23rd with clubs and 16th with ribbon. She was then selected for the European Championships in Tel Aviv, taking 79th place with clubs and 5th place in teams along Margarita Kolosov, Darja Varfolomeev and the senior group.

Routine music information

References 

2005 births
Living people
German rhythmic gymnasts
21st-century German women
People from Euskirchen